Vinh Chap (tiếng Việt: Vĩnh Chấp) is one of the 20 communes of Vĩnh Linh district in Quảng Trị, a province in north-central Vietnam. The commune is served by National Road 1 and the North-South Railway, which both run directly through its territory.

Communes of Quảng Trị province